The Southeastern Anatolia Project (GAP) is a multi-sector integrated regional development project based on the concept of sustainable development for the 9 million people (2005) living in the Southeastern Anatolia region of Turkey. According to a governmental source, the aim of the GAP is to eliminate regional development disparities by raising incomes and living standards and to contribute to the national development targets of social stability and economic growth by enhancing the productive and employment generating capacity of the rural sector. The total cost of the project is over 100 billion Turkish lira (TL) (2017 adjusted price), of which 30.6 billion TL of this investment was realized at the end of 2010. The real investment (corrected value) was 72.6% for the end of 2010. The project area covers nine provinces (Adıyaman, Batman, Diyarbakır, Gaziantep, Kilis, Siirt, Şanlıurfa, Mardin, and Şırnak) which are located in the basins of the Euphrates and Tigris and in Upper Mesopotamia.

Current activities under GAP include sectors like agriculture and irrigation, hydroelectric power production, urban and rural infrastructure, forestry, education and health. Water resources development envisages the construction of 22 dams and 19 power plants (nine plants, corresponding to 74% capacity of total projected power output, were completed by 2010) and irrigation schemes on an area extending over 17,000 square kilometres. Seven airports have been built and are currently active. The GAP cargo airport in Şırnak, which is also the biggest in Turkey, has been completed.

History

The initial idea and decision to utilize the waters of the Euphrates and Tigris rivers came from Atatürk, the founder of the Republic. In the 1920s and 1930s, the need for electrical energy was a priority issue. The Electricity Studies Administration was founded in 1936 to investigate how rivers in the country could be utilized for energy production. The Administration began its detailed studies with the "Keban Dam Project" and established observation stations to assess the flow and other characteristics of the Euphrates. The GAP as it is structured today, was planned in the 1970s consisting of projects for irrigation and hydraulic energy production on the Euphrates and Tigris, but transformed into a multi-sector social and economic development program for the region in the early 80s. The development program encompassed such sectors as irrigation, hydraulic energy, agriculture, rural and urban infrastructure, forestry, education and health. With the development of new GAP Administrative structure in 1988–1989, its basic objectives included the improvement of living standards and income levels of people so as to eliminate regional development disparities (economic inequality) and contributing to national goals such as social stability and economic growth by enhancing productivity and employment opportunities in the rural sector.

Tensions between Turkey, Syria and Iraq were raised from time to time due to GAP. Syria and Iraq demanded more water to be released, while Turkey declined so as to form the dam reservoirs. Because of this GAP is one of the world's most well protected dam projects, especially against aircraft. GAP also almost came to a complete halt in the early 1990s due to the high level of Kurdish terrorist (PKK) activities in the region. The PKK is not only blamed for a number of funding cuts as funds were diverted to support the counter-terrorism effort, but is also blamed for damaging several dams and canals, as well as killing engineers working at the dams. A number of economic crises also played a very important part in the delays of GAP.

The UN embargo on Iraq (which was lifted after the Second Gulf War) had negative effects on development efforts and region's trade with Middle Eastern countries, which are its natural economic partners. Furthermore, imbalances in public financing delayed the financing needs of the project. Finally, a number of judicial questions needed clearing over the flooding of several historical sites as well as local residences as described in the "Social effect" section.

Strategic goal
Historically, Southeastern Anatolia was located on the trading route between East and West. The region had been an important source of cultural diversity. However the changes in the trading routes and the agricultural methods ended the old importance of the region.

The 1989 Master Plan had aimed to initiate the revitalization of the economic, social and cultural life in the region through an "integrated regional development project". The rise in the income of the region was directly transferred to restoration and revitalization of the cultural activities in the region, instead of moving into the national budget. This master plan did not reach its goals because of the issues stated under the introduction section. However, for this negative perspective, with the international community involvement, project added new dimensions and concepts to the definitions.

The concerns and concepts of the environment, sustainability and participation, which were either overlooked or totally absent in the original plan has been added with the UNDP support. The revised "GAP Regional Development Plan" with a new understanding is currently in place. The macro frame of the GAP Regional Development Plan (GAP-RDP) is drawn by 8th Five-Year Development Plan coordinated with the efforts under the "Program for Transition to a Strengthened Economy" prepared as a part of the process for Turkey's accession to the European Union.

Social effect

The project rests upon the philosophy of sustainable human development, which aims to create an environment in which future generations can benefit and develop. The basic strategies of the project include fairness in development, participation, environmental protection, jobs creation, spatial planning and infrastructure development. In reaching these goals the primary objective of GAP is to normalize levels of development, income, and living standards between the southeastern region and other regions of Turkey. GAP is transforming the region completely by creating economic and social opportunities and promoting business. Critical infrastructure, such as airports and highways, is being constructed to support the development of the region. GAP will provide jobs to an estimated 3.5 million people directly.(http://gradworks.umi.com/15/16/1516490.html)

Economic development

Irrigation
GAP is estimated to double Turkey's irrigable farmland. The increase of agricultural activity of GAP in its incomplete state is visible clearly on the USDA graph above. Cotton production increased from 150,000 metric tons to 400,000 metric tons, making the region the top cotton producer. But at the same time other regions declined, which means that Turkey's overall output stayed relatively steady.

GAP is supposed to create 17,000 square kilometres (4.2 million acres) of farmland in the Harran plain alone, as visible on two USDA maps above.

Reports indicate that, due to irrigation from the Atatürk Dam, harvest yields of cotton, wheat, barley, lentils, and other grains in the Harran plain have tripled. A number of Agriculture Department backed initiatives are encouraging farmers to experiment with new varieties of fruits, vegetables, and nuts that did not exist in the region prior.

Imports and exports
The amount of foreign trade of the region is continuously rising since 2002. In 2002, total export from the region was 689 million $ and total imports stood at 773 million $. In 2010, total exports from G.A.P. region reached 4.166 billion $, while imports reached 3.167 billion $. Since 2004 the G.A.P. region is net exporter.

Fishing
GAP is being built in a region where water used to be a scarcity. With the vast number of lakes being formed, plans to use them as breeding spaces for commercial fishing are also underway. In the case of the Atatürk Dam the fishing industry in the region is already developing.

Power
The GAP also consists of 19 hydroelectric power plants. These will supply the energy equivalent of 22% of the anticipated total nationwide energy consumption in 2010. Providing 8,900 gigawatt hours (32 PJ), it is one of the largest series of hydroelectric power plants in the world.

Infrastructure

Dams

Southeastern Anatolia Project  consists of 22 Dams (year of completion):
Euphrates Basin
Atatürk Dam (1992)
Birecik Dam (2000)
Büyükçay Dam
Çamgazi Dam (1998)
Çetintepe Dam (2017)
Gömikan Dam
Hancağız Dam (1988)
Kahta Dam
Karakaya Dam (1987)
Karkamış Dam (1999)
Kayacık Dam (2005)
Kemlin Dam
Koçali Dam (2016)
Sırımtaş Dam (2013)

 Tigris Basin
Batman Dam (1998)
Cizre Dam
Dicle Dam (1997)
Garzan Dam (2012)
Kayser Dam
Kralkızı Dam (1997)
Ilısu Dam (2018)
Silvan Dam (2019)

Maintenance
The reason for the sheer number of dams in the project, more than would at first appear needed, is maintenance. Dams need to be cleaned from the debris carried with the water flow. After a while the dam becomes obsolete as water flow slows down to inadequate levels. The dams will be shut down every 5 to 10 years for fall maintenance (also called fall cleanup). Water levels are normally lowest in fall. The extra dams are placed in service during this maintenance period.

In cases of natural disasters such as floods, the maintenance may be performed earlier. The plan is to have one or two dams spare in case an emergency shutdown of any dam is necessary. While shutting down a dam also shuts down irrigation channels linked to it, it can nevertheless continue providing power.

Engineering behind the project

Providing electricity and irrigation is challenging in a region as large as the one targeted by GAP. A constant flow of water is imperative.

After a large body of water is collected behind the dam a constant flow of water is then available. The height of the dam allows the water to go at a high velocity through the turbines thus generating electricity. After the fast flowing water exits the dam it is slowed down by a concrete energy dissipator (pictured). Creation of electricity is only part of the usage of the tons of water collected at the dam.

When dealing with tons of water, it has to be distributed evenly and slowly. Occasionally main channels will need maintenance, or may be damaged due to external reasons. In order to even assess the problem, tons of water need to be removed from the main channel. The best way to do this is to slow the overall flow from the main dam and redirect all water flowing originally through the damaged channel to backup channels. Radial gates serve this purpose, they regulate the flow of water. It is imperative to keep water flowing. Lack of the flow will not only compromise all irrigation linked to that channel but also all cities linked will experience a power outage.

After leaving the energy dissipator, water flows into a set of main channels, which flow in different directions supplying water to a greater area. They are the most critical part of a dam project aside from the dam itself. This is as critical as high-voltage transmission lines in power grids.

Sluice gates regulate the flow of water. If water flows too fast it will overflow and probably damage one or more of the channels, or flood irrigation fields. Multiple sluice gates regulate the speed of the flow on different sections of the channel. They can also be used like radial gates to cut water in channels.

After leaving the radial gates on the main channel, water flows to canals which are smaller and can carry less water. Flow regulators divert water on canals to distribution canals. Just like radial gates and sluice gates, flow generators can stop water flow if necessary. Distribution canals are the last step as far as engineers are concerned. It delivers water to different sections of large fields, pretty much an artificial river.

It is up to farmers to get the water from distribution channels to their crops for irrigation. There are different methods to do this; any one or a combination of earth distribution channel, furrow, and drip tubes can be used.

Sub-projects
The latest design of the project divides the GAP into smaller projects. Each project generates its own annual reports and activity sheets.

 Management, Operation and Maintenance of GAP Irrigation Systems (GAP-MOM),
 Regulation of Water in Irrigation Canals and Methods and Technologies for Water Saving,
 Treatment of Urban Waste Water,
 Re-use of Irrigation Discharge Water,
 Protection of Biological Diversity,
 Environmental Work in the GAP Region,
 Environmental Work in the GAP Region — Tigris Basin,
 Assessment of Climatic Conditions in the Region for Present Day and Future,
 Adıyaman-Kuyulu Region Erosion Control Project,
 Adıyaman-Diran Micro-Catchment Rehabilitation Project,
 GAP Afforestation Project,
 Participation in urban planning and zoning,
 Resettlement and employment of people affected by dam lakes,
 Atatürk Dam Lake Sub-Regional Development Plan,
 Eco-city and eco-village planning and development in pilot localities.
 Establishment of Multi-Purpose Community Centers (ÇATOM) for Women,
 Improving the Income Level of People in Non-Irrigated Areas,
 GAP Entrepreneur Support and Guidance Centers (GAP-GIDEM),
 Project for On-Contract Animal Husbandry (GAP Rings Model),
 Project for Joint Machinery Use (GAP OMAK),
 Sub-Regional Development Plan Comprising Return to Villages and Rehabilitation,
 Project for the Rehabilitation of Children Working in Streets.
 Institutional Capacity Building,
 Training and Extension Services for Farmers,
 Land Consolidation,
 Social Progress for Youth,
 GAP Region Public Health Project.

Status of GAP
The water resources development component of the program envisages the construction of 22 dams and 19 hydraulic power plants and irrigation of 17,000 square kilometres of land. The total cost of the project is estimated at $32 billion USD. The total installed capacity of power plants is 7454 MW and projected annual energy production reaches 27 billion kWh.

Currently the physical realization of the project stands at 72.6%. Government aims to complete major part of the project by the end of 2012. The amount of government investment for 2010 was around 4 billion TL, which corresponds to 14.2% of Turkey's total investment for same year.

Criticism of the project

Ilısu Dam
Completion of the Ilısu Dam would cause the flooding of the ancient city of Hasankeyf whose history stretches back over 10,000 years. Investigations by the Kurdish Human Rights Project (KHRP) found that:

 The town is of particular cultural significance to the Kurdish people: the delegation found a widespread perception that the GAP project, and Ilısu in particular, is motivated primarily by a desire to destroy the Kurds as an ethnic group by destroying their most important cultural sites.

Between 50 and 68 hamlets and villages will be flooded affecting approximately 25,000 local people. An additional 57 villages will have their land partially flooded.

Construction began on August 5, 2006 after a ceremony led by Prime Minister Recep Tayyip Erdoğan.

Archaeological losses
Critics of the project say that the dam could effectively destroy the artifacts of ancient Kurdish, Armenian, and Assyrian habitation in the region.

TRT GAP

TRT GAP, belonging to the Turkish Radio and Television Corporation, has been established to enhance the recognition of The Southeastern Anatolia Project, abbreviated as GAP, on a rational ground which serves forming the necessary social, cultural and psychological environment in the region. Within this context, the Channel aims to meet the demands of those living in the East and Southeast Anatolia as well as inform them about the contributions resulting from the Project (GAP) to the region and the country at large.

TRT GAP's programs are especially produced by paying attention to both the needs and peculiarities of the East and Southeast Anatolia, consisting education, culture, drama, music programs and news with commercials.

TRT GAP's transmissions are realized through the same channel with the TRT 3 since 2001 (which broadcasts live footage of TBMM TV) on a time-share basis.

From 1989 to 2001 TRT GAP was broadcasting on TRT 2 before being revamped as a 24-hour news and culturally-oriented channel.

See also
 Baku-Tbilisi-Ceyhan pipeline
 Ilısu Dam Campaign
 Water politics

External links
 Official GAP website in English
 Official GAP website in Turkish
 Southeastern Anatolia Project, USDA
 Environmental Impact Assessment Report Introduction PDF
 Environmental Impact Assessment Report Project Background and Description PDF
 Re-Emergence of Discredited Ilısu Dam Project
 The effects and impacts of the Southeastern Anatolian Development project - a thesis by Yilmaz, Mustafa, M.A.
TRT's Official Website 
TRT Gap Broadcasting Schedule
Watch TRT GAP/TRT 3 live Online
TRT GAP at LyngSat Address

References

 
Water supply and sanitation in Turkey
Planned developments
Euphrates
Tigris River
Dams in Turkey
Irrigation in Turkey
Irrigation projects
Hydroelectricity in Turkey
Reservoirs in Turkey
Turkish Kurdistan
Southeastern Anatolia Region
Upper Mesopotamia
Economic history of Turkey
Turkish-language television stations
Television channels and stations established in 1989
Television channels and stations disestablished in 2015
1989 establishments in Turkey
Mass media in Ankara
Turkish Radio and Television Corporation
Defunct television channels in Turkey